Cináeth Ua Baígill was a bishop in Ireland during the 12th century: he was Bishop of Clogher  until his death in1135.

References

12th-century Roman Catholic bishops in Ireland
Pre-Reformation bishops of Clogher
1135 deaths